Hepatitis C virus stem-loop VII is a regulatory element found in the coding region of the RNA-dependent RNA polymerase gene, NS5B. Similarly to stem-loop IV, the stem-loop structure is important (but not essential) for colony formation, though its exact function and mechanism are unknown.

See also 
 Hepatitis C alternative reading frame stem-loop
 Hepatitis C virus (HCV) cis-acting replication element (CRE)
 Hepatitis C virus 3'X element

References

External links 
 

Cis-regulatory RNA elements
Hepatitis C virus